The Palu River (Indonesian: Sungai Palu) is a river in Central Sulawesi, Sulawesi island, Indonesia, about 1600 km northeast of the capital Jakarta.

Hydrology 
The river flows through the city of Palu, with 41% of the basin area covered by the protected tropical montane forest of the Lore Lindu National Park.

Geography
The river flows in the west area of Sulawesi with predominantly tropical rainforest climate (designated as Af in the Köppen-Geiger climate classification). The annual average temperature in the area is 24 °C. The warmest month is October, when the average temperature is around 26 °C, and the coldest is July, at 22 °C. The average annual rainfall is 2092 mm. The wettest month is August, with an average of 252 mm rainfall, and the driest is February, with 114 mm rainfall.

See also
List of rivers of Indonesia
List of rivers of Sulawesi

References

Rivers of Central Sulawesi
Rivers of Indonesia
Palu